WPT may refer to:

 World Poker Tour
 Wireless power transfer
 Wisconsin Public Television, the former brand name of PBS Wisconsin